Reynold "Renny" Pereira (9 January 1948 – 1 June 1979) was a Kenyan field hockey player. He competed at the 1968 Summer Olympics and the 1972 Summer Olympics.

References

External links
 

1948 births
1979 deaths
Kenyan male field hockey players
Olympic field hockey players of Kenya
Field hockey players at the 1968 Summer Olympics
Field hockey players at the 1972 Summer Olympics
Sportspeople from Nairobi
Kenyan people of Indian descent
Kenyan people of Goan descent